Ecuador–Turkey relations are foreign relations between Ecuador and Turkey. Ecuador has an embassy in Ankara since 2009. Turkey has an embassy in Quito since 2012.

Presidential Visits

Economic links

Trade volume between the two countries was 117 million USD in 2019. (Turkish exports/imports: 59/58 million USD)

See also 

 Foreign relations of Ecuador
 Foreign relations of Turkey

References 

 
Turkey
Bilateral relations of Turkey